Peter Howe may refer to:
 Peter Anton Howe, American-born farmer and political figure in Saskatchewan
 Peter Howe (New South Wales politician), Australian politician and convict